s-nfr-f:r-w
Sneferukhaf was an Egyptian prince who lived during the 4th Dynasty. He was a son of Prince Nefermaat II and unknown woman, and thus a grandson of Princess Nefertkau I. He was named after his great-grandfather, Pharaoh Sneferu. He had two sons. He was buried in mastaba G 7070 at Giza.

Titles 
His full list of titles were:

Translations and indexes from Dilwyn Jones.

References 

Princes of the Fourth Dynasty of Egypt